Marmara isortha is a moth of the family Gracillariidae. It is known from Guyana, Brazil and India.

The larvae feed on Theobroma cacao. They mine the fruit of their host plant.

References

Gracillariinae
Moths described in 1915